Aesop Rock is an American hip hop artist currently signed to Rhymesayers Entertainment. His discography consists of nine studio albums, three extended plays, ten singles, four collaborations, one compilation, nine music videos, and many appearances on other artists' tracks and on compilations.

Aesop initially recorded and released two self-financed records: Music for Earthworms in 1997 and the Appleseed EP in 1999. After being signed to the Mush label, Aesop Rock released his first major album, Float, in 2000. Shortly thereafter, Aesop Rock signed to Manhattan-based hip hop label Definitive Jux, where he released Labor Days in 2001, Bazooka Tooth in 2003, and None Shall Pass in 2007. His 2012 album Skelethon and 2016 album The Impossible Kid were released by Rhymesayers Entertainment.

Albums

Studio albums

Soundtrack albums

Downloadable mixes

Extended plays

Singles

Music videos

Guest appearances

Production credits

Original contributions to compilations
{|class="wikitable"
|-
! style="width:33px;"|Year
! style="width:200px;"|Tracks
! style="width:225px;"|Album
! style="width:250px;"|Other contributing artists
|-
| style="text-align:center;"|1999
|"Tugboat Complex"
|Inside Out: Vol. 1
|
|-
| style="text-align:center;"|2000
|"The Active Element"
|Ropeladder 12''''
|
|-
| style="text-align:center;" rowspan="2"|2001
|"Kill 'em All"
|Def Jux Presents|
|-
|"Wise Up"
|Tags of the Times 3|
|-
| style="text-align:center;" rowspan="4"|2002
|"Skip Town""Dinner with Blockhead"
|Modern Montra(DJ Spooky mix album)
|
|-
|"Dead Pan"
|Def Jux Presents 2|
|-
|"Train Buffer"
|Urban Renewal|
|-
|"Inner City Hustle"
|Embedded Studios Presents:The Bedford Files|with L.I.F.E. Long
|-
| style="text-align:center;" rowspan="3"|2003
|"Numb (To the Guns)"
|Nature Sounds Presents:The Prof. In... Convexed Sampler|
|-
|"Dragon Coaster"
|The Bastard EP 12'|with Mojo
|-
|"Miss By A Mile"
|We Came From Beyond, Vol. 2
|with Slug and Eyedea
|-
| style="text-align:center;"|2004
|"All in All"
|Def Jux Presents 3
|
|-
| style="text-align:center;" rowspan="2"|2005
|"Preservation"
|Wu-Tang Meets the Indie Culture
|with Del tha Funkee Homosapien
|-
|"Junkyard"
|NBA 2K6: The Tracks
|
|}

 Collaborations 

 Lice 
 Lice (2015)
 Still Buggin (2016)
 Triple Fat Lice (2017)

 Hail Mary Mallon 

 The Uncluded 

 The Weathermen 

 Malibu Ken 

See also
Definitive Jux discography

ReferencesGeneral Specific'''

External links
Aesop Rock  at Definitive Jux

Hip hop discographies
Discographies of American artists
Production discographies